Little Paris may refer to:
 Little Paris (film), 2008 German film
 Little Paris, a nickname for South Kensington, an affluent district of West London in the Royal Borough of Kensington and Chelsea, where a strong French community is living
 Little Paris, a nickname for Carroll Gardens, Brooklyn, a neighborhood in the New York City borough where an important community of French expatriates, French-speaking immigrants or American citizens of French descent are living
 Little Paris (Micul Paris), an alternative nickname for Bucharest, the capital of Romania, more popularly nicknamed "Paris of the East"
 Little Paris, a nickname for Leipzig in Germany, Klein-Paris (Little Paris, Goethe) or Paris des Ostens (Paris of the East)
 Küçük Paris, a neighbourhood in the Southern district of Plovdiv, Bulgaria, the name of which means "Little Paris" in Turkish
 Little Paris, a nickname for Tianducheng, a planned residential community of Hangzhou that is designed to resemble Paris, France
 Paris Kuchulu (Paris the little, Little Paris) a nickname for Borujerd, a beautiful city in Lorestan, Iran.
 Petit Paris (Little Paris), a historical nickname for St. Martinville, Louisiana, USA
 Little Paris, a nickname for Da Lat, a city in Vietnam
 Little Paris, a nickname for Sinj, a city in Croatia
 Little Paris, Atça a town in Turkey, planned from Charles de Gaulle Square

See also
 Paris of the East (disambiguation)
 Paris of the South
 Paris of the West (disambiguation)
 Paris of the North (disambiguation)

Lists of cities by nickname